Malik Yusef El Shabazz Jones (born April 4, 1971) is an American spoken word artist, poet, rapper, writer, composer, producer and director based in Chicago, Illinois, United States.

Early life
He was raised in Chicago's South Side neighborhood known as the "Wild 100's" and is a former member of the Blackstone Rangers street gang. In his youth he became friendly with rapper Common. He is dyslexic, which he first realized as a teenager. He has evolved over the years from a street poet into an actor, mainly acting out his "street hustler" persona. In an interview an ex-girlfriend said this persona couldn't be further from the truth. His name means "King Joseph" (Malik and  Yusuf, respectively) in Arabic

Poetry career
As a spoken word artist, poetry allowed Yusef the aesthetic freedom to comment on a wide breadth of personal and social issues while his lyrics remained commensurate with a global vision: to encourage the benevolence in all people. His voice incorporates street vernacular against backdrops of hip-hop beats, organic keyboards, guitars and horns. The Chicago native has made his career as a "wordsmith," reciting verses that chronicle inner city life growing up on the urban streets of the Windy City. His lexicon tells stories that speak to both the intricate depths and heights of ghetto culture, as well as global socio-economic woes.

The inspiration to formulate his mosaic of words comes from his children, his dreams, the ancestors and other prolific poets. Some of his influences include Langston Hughes, William Shakespeare, Haki Madhubuti and Phillis Wheatley. His spoken word artistry has contributed to promotional campaigns including ASCAP, Sprite, Coca-Cola, General Motors, Chrysler, Verizon, Miller Brewing Co. and Nike.

Acting career
He got his first break when New Line Cinema Director Ted Witcher commissioned him to coach Larenz Tate in the romantic drama "Love Jones" which went on to garner a Sundance Film Festival Award and three NAACP Image Awards. While filming in Chicago, Yusef additionally made a cameo as a guest spoken word artist.

In 2007 he collaborated with Director Frey Hoffman (Kanye West's "Jesus Walks," Sa-Ra' featuring Erykah Badu and Talib Kweli "Feel the Bass") for the film adaptation of Yusef's poem "Hollywood Jerome." The two contemporaries previously joined forces for Yusef's 2005 music video "Wouldn't You Like to Ride" featuring Kanye West and Common. Their film "The Untimely Demise of Hollywood Jerome" presents a gritty street drama, chronicling the tale of a 14-year-old South Side gang member who idolizes classic Hollywood gangsters like the archetypical Scarface and Godfather. Yusef and Hoffman's film openly confronts pop culture's misrepresentation and glorification of gang warfare. The film culminates in the protagonist caught up in a police stand-off on the opposite side of town. Cameos include Kanye West and Twista.

Television career
His most noticeable performance came in 2002 during a featured poem entitled "I Spit…" on Season 2 of HBO's "Russell Simmon's Def Poetry Jam." The segment also featured artists including Malcolm Jamal Warner and legendary hip hop icon Rakim. Yusef appeared as himself in the 2005 VH-1 Television Series "Driven," a documentary surrounding the life of friend Kanye West, also featuring appearances from Common, Damon Dash, Jermaine Dupri, Jay-Z, Ludacris and Russell Simmons. He additionally made guest appearances on ABC Worldwide News, WGN Morning News, CLTV's Garrard McClendon Live!, BET's Rap City and MTV's Hip-Hop Week.

Music career

The Great Chicago Fire; A Cold Day in Hell (Universal Records 2003)
He released his solo album featuring local talent including Kanye West, Carl Thomas, Marvo 11, Chantay Savage, Michael Coleman, Common and Twista, documenting an amalgam of eroticism, religion, gangster folklore and hip-hop. The Source magazine dubbed the debut "a classic."

G.O.O.D. Morning, G.O.O.D. Night (G.O.O.D Music Recordings 2009)
He released his sophomore effort, G.O.O.D. Morning, G.O.O.D. Night in June 2009, featuring guest musicians and producers Kanye West, Common, Raheem Devaughn, Christopher Denson, Jennifer Hudson, Michelle Williams, Hearontrackz, KRS One, Adam Levine of Maroon 5, Twista, Jes.Tone, rock band Violet Nine and soul pianist John Legend, as well as musician Mr. Hudson. The concept of the reflective double CD displayed Protagonist vs. Antagonist/Lower Self vs. Higher Self, exhibiting the poet's struggle between his internal dualities.

The first single "Magic Man" featured Kanye West, Common and John Legend. Another song called "By Your Side"  which featured Destiny's Child member Michelle Williams and singer Brando, leaked on the internet Vocal Production by Christopher Denson

2012-present: Cruel Summer
Yusef made an appearance on the G.O.O.D. Music collaborative album, Cruel Summer, which was released on September 18, 2012. He appeared on the track, "Sin City," along with fellow G.O.O.D. Music artists John Legend, Teyana Taylor, Cyhi the Prynce, and Travis Scott.

Discography

Albums
The Great Chicago Fire; A Cold Day in Hell (Universal Records 2003)
G.O.O.D. Morning, G.O.O.D. Night (GOOD Music 2009)

Singles
"Wouldn't You Like To Ride" featuring Kanye West and Common (2005)
"Magic Man" featuring Kanye West, Common and John Legend (2009)

Collaborations
He and jazz saxophonist Mike Phillips (Hidden Beach Records) collaborated on the song "This is Not a Game", which was selected by basketball star Michael Jordan and appeared on the interactive CD-Rom included alongside his limited edition Jordan 17 Sneakers in August 2002. His work has also been featured on a string of albums, particularly alongside his comrades and Chicago natives.

"My City" – Common - One Day It'll All Make Sense (Relativity Records 1997)
"Trouble Don't Last Always" – Carl Thomas – Emotional (Bad Boy Records 2000)
"Know it's Alright" – Carl Thomas – Let's Talk About It (Bad Boy Records 2004)
"Wouldn't You Like To Ride" featuring Common & Kanye West - Coach Carter soundtrack (Capitol Records 2005)
"Crack Music" - Kanye West featuring The Game - Late Registration (Roc-a-Fella Records 2005)
"Mr. Blue Collar" - Rhymefest - Blue Collar (Allido Records 2006)
"Welcome to Chi" - Dr. Cornel West - Never Forget: A Journey of Revelations (Hidden Beach Records 2007)
"Stay Up" - Kanye West featuring 88-Keys - The Death of Adam (Extra Credit) (2007)
"Promised Land" – Kanye West, Adam Levine, John Legend - Barack Obama: Yes We Can soundtrack (Hidden Beach Records 2008)
"Always Be Arriving" – Kindred the Family Soul - Arrival (Hidden Beach Records 2008)
"Woman I Desire" – Raheem DeVaughn - Love Behind the Melody (Jive Records 2008)
"Magic Man" – Kanye West & Malik Yusef, featuring John Legend & Common (G.O.O.D. Music 2009)
"Fragile" – Raheem DeVaughn - The Love & War MasterPeace (Jive Records 2010)
"Ayyy Girl" – JYJ featuring Kanye West and Malik Yusef -  The Beginning (C-JeS/Warner 2010)
"Sin City (Cruel Summer)" - Kanye West featuring  John Legend, Travis Scott, Teyana Taylor, Cyhi the Prynce & Malik Yusef (GOOD Music album 2012)
"Nobody's Smiling" – Common – Nobody's Smiling (Def-Jam Recordings/ARTium Records 2014)
 "Actress" - Ty Dolla $ign (atlantic records 2015)
 "Free Love" - Vic Mensa featuring Malik Yusef 2016

Producing or writing, composing 
 Drake - "Glow" OVO Sound, Young Money, Cash Money, Republic Records 2017
 Vic Mensa - "The Manuscript" Virgin EMI Records 2017
 Vic Mensa, Mr Hudson - "almost there" Virgin EMI Records 2017
 Vic Mensa - "heaven on earth" Roc Nation, Capitol 2017
 Vic Mensa - "Didn't i" Roc Nation, Capitol 2017
 Vic Mensa - "OMG" Roc Nation, Capitol 2017
 Vic Mensa - "The Fire Next Time Lyrics" 2017
 Vic Mensa - "Wings" Roc Nation, Capitol 2017
 Vic Mensa - "We Could Be Free" Roc Nation, Capitol 2017
 Vic Mensa - "Down for Some Ignorance" Wings" Roc Nation, Capitol 2017
 Vic Mensa - "Memories on 47th St."  Roc Nation, Capitol 2017
 Beyonce - "Lemonade" Parkwood, Columbia 2016
 Beyonce - "Sandcastles" Parkwood, Columbia 2016
 Vic Mensa - "There's Alot Going On" Roc Nation, Def Jam Recordings 2016
 Vic Mensa - "16 Shots" Roc Nation, Def Jam Recordings 2016
 Vic Mensa - "Free love" 2016
 Kanye West - "The life of Pablo" Good Music, Def Jam Recordings 2016
 Kanye West - "Famous" Good Music, Def Jam Recordings 2016
 Kanye West - "Ultralight Beam" Good Music, Def Jam Recordings 2016
 Kanye West - "Father Stretch My Hands PT.1" Good Music, Def Jam Recordings 2016
 Kanye West - "All Day" Good Music, Def Jam Recordings 2016
 Kanye West - "Feedback" Good Music, Def Jam Recordings 2016
 Kanye West - "Highlights" Good Music, Def Jam Recordings 2016
 Kanye West - "Free Style 4" Good Music, Def Jam Recordings 2016
 Kanye West - "I Love Kanye" Good Music, Def Jam Recordings 2016
 Kanye West - "Waves" Good Music, Def Jam Recordings 2016
 Kanye West - "FML" Good Music, Def Jam Recordings 2016
 Kanye West - "Real Friends" Good Music, Def Jam Recordings 2016
 Kanye West - "Wolves" Good Music, Def Jam Recordings 2016
 Kanye West - "30 Hours" Good Music, Def Jam Recordings 2016
 Kanye West - "No More Parties in LA" Good Music, Def Jam Recordings 2016
 Kanye West - "Fade" Good Music, Def Jam Recordings 2016
 Channel Live - "Ghetto B.I" Flavor Unit 2016
 Ty Dolla $ign - "Actress" Atlantic Records 2015
 Common - "Nobody's Smiling" Def Jam Recordings 2014
 Snoh Aalegra - "Bad things" 2014
 Kanye West - "Yeezus" Def Jam Recordings, a division of UMG Recordings, Inc 2013
 Kanye West - "Bound 2" Def Jam Recordings, a division of UMG Recordings, Inc 2013
 Kanye West - "On Sight" Def Jam Recordings, a division of UMG Recordings, Inc 2013
 Kanye West - "Black Skinhead" Def Jam Recordings, a division of UMG Recordings, Inc 2013
 Kanye West - "I Am A God" Def Jam Recordings, a division of UMG Recordings, Inc 2013
 Kanye West - "Hold My Liquor" Def Jam Recordings, a division of UMG Recordings, Inc 2013
 Kanye West - "I'm In It" Def Jam Recordings, a division of UMG Recordings, Inc 2013
 Kanye West - "Blood On The Leaves" Def Jam Recordings, a division of UMG Recordings, Inc 2013
 Kanye West - "Mercy" Def Jam Recordings, a division of UMG Recordings, Inc 2012
 Kanye West - "New Slaves" Def Jam Recordings, a division of UMG Recordings, Inc 2012
 Kanye West - "Cruel Summer" Def Jam Recordings, a division of UMG Recordings, Inc 2012
 Kanye West - "Sin City" Def Jam Recordings, a division of UMG Recordings, Inc 2012
 Kanye West - "The One" Def Jam Recordings, a division of UMG Recordings, Inc 2012
 Snoop Dogg - "Gangbang Rookie" Doggystyle, Priority 2011
 Snoop Dogg - "i don't need no bitch" Doggystyle, Priority 2011
 Kanye West - "All of the Lights" Def Jam Recordings 2010
 Kanye West - "My Dark Twisted Fantasy" Def Jam Recordings 2010
 Kanye West - "Dark Fantasy" Def Jam Recordings 2010
 Kanye West - "Gorgeous" Def Jam Recordings 2010
 Kanye West - "Devil in a New Dress" Def Jam Recordings 2010
 Kanye West - "Runaway" Def Jam Recordings 2010
 Kanye West - "Power" Def Jam Recordings 2010
 Kanye West - "Monster" Def Jam Recordings 2010
 Kanye West - "Robocop" Def Jam Recordings 2010
 John Legend and the Roots- "The Little Ghetto Boy" Good Music 2010 
 Raheem DeVaughn - "The Love & War MasterPeace" Jive, Zomba 2010
 Raheem DeVaughn - "Fragile" Jive, Zomba 2009
 DO or Die (D.O.D) - "Around Here" 2010
 Kanye West - "Magic Man" Good Music 2009
 Raheem DeVaughn - "Woman I Desire"  Jive 2009
 Kanye West - "Amazing" Roc-A-Fella Records (Def Jam Recordings) 2008
 Kanye West - "Love Lockdown" Roc-A-Fella Records (Def Jam Recordings) 2008
 Kanye West - "Heartless" Roc-A-Fella Records (Def Jam Recordings) 2008
 Kanye West - "Promised Land" Roc-A-Fella Records (Def Jam Recordings) 2008
 Kindred the Family Soul - "Always be Arriving (Finale)" Hidden Beach Recordings, Shanachie Records 2008
 Kindred the Family Soul - "Poetry Interlude" Hidden Beach Recordings, Shanachie Records 2008
 Kanye West - "Stay Up" Roc-A-Fella Records (Def Jam Recordings) 2007
 Rhymefest - "Mr. blue collar" Def Jam Recordings 2006
 Kanye West - "Late Registration " Def Jam Recordings 2005
 Kanye West - "Crack Music" Def Jam Recordings 2005
 Carl Thomas - "Know It's Alright" Big Beat Records 2004
 Common - "My city" Relativity Records 1997

Grammys
Yusef has won six Grammy from twelve nominations.

Tours
 Winter 2018: Jay-Z 4:44 Tour / Jay-Z and Vic mensa and Malik yusef 
 Summer 2008 : "The Art of Love Tour" f/ Raheem Devaughn and Chrisette Michele
 Spring 2008 : "Real Thing Tour" f/ Jill Scott & Raheem Devaughn
 Fall 2005 : "Touch the Sky Tour" f/ Kanye West & Keyshia Cole
 Summer 2000 : Carl Thomas & Mary J. Blige Tour

References

External links
 

1971 births
Living people
American spoken word artists
Musicians from Chicago
Grammy Award winners for rap music
GOOD Music artists
Almighty Black P. Stone Nation
Writers with dyslexia